The Inevitable Past Is the Future Forgotten is the fourth studio album by Three Mile Pilot, released on September 28, 2010 by Temporary Residence Limited. It was the first full-length album the band released since 1997's Another Desert, Another Sea.

Track listing

Personnel 
Adapted from The Inevitable Past Is the Future Forgotten liner notes.

Three Mile Pilot
 Pall Jenkins – vocals, guitar
 Armistead Burwell Smith IV – bass guitar, backing vocals
 Tom Zinser – drums, accordion

Additional musicians
 Tobias Nathaniel – piano (7)
 Matt Resovich – violin (8)
Production and additional personnel
 Kris Poulin – mixing
 Three Mile Pilot – record producer, recording

Release history

References

External links 
 

2010 albums
Temporary Residence Limited albums
Three Mile Pilot albums